Caley J. Hall (born 1975) is classified as a listed New Zealand investment artist in Invercargill and Queenstown, New Zealand. Hall specializes in oil painting, and is well known for his Fiordland landscapes  and expressionist abstracts. A largely self-taught artist, he has learned techniques and takes inspiration from other New Zealand artists, including renowned Queenstown-based painter Tim Wilson, Canterbury wilderness artist Nathanael Provis and Central Otago-based painter Peter Beadle. He exhibited his large abstracts at the Peppers Bluewater Resort in Tekapo in 2012.

Caley is the artist formerly known as DJ Biggles, having worked in the club scene for many years. He also got himself in the news throughout Australasia in 1999 for giving then New Zealand Prime Minister Jenny Shipley a "cheeky" kiss on the cheek during a visit to the Earnslaw. Hall has written a book, “Jackson and the Plum Tree”, about his Highland cow Maggie and his Kunekune Jackson.

He has been featured in the New Zealand media numerous times, particularly for the generous support he has given to schools in the region both raising funds and introducing the pupils to landscape art. Caley was also in the January / February 2016 edition of The New Zealand Artist for his distinctive landscape style.   In November 2016, it was announced that he would be the first artist in residence on a new ship dedicated to international wildlife and marine conservation. An artwork donated to the help fund the Earthrace Conservation’s new vessel Earthrace-2 is due to be auctioned at the prestigious Mossgreen-Webbs on February 28 with a guide price of $12,000 - $18,000. In May 2017 while working in his studio, Hall noticed the neighbouring Loss and Grief Centre were fundraising and donated a large landscape piece for their raffle.

In July 2017, Caley held a workshop at the Barking Mad Studio in Weaverville, California with the support of the local art community. The four-hour intensive class focused on oil-painting techniques with all proceeds generously donated to the Main Street Gallery in Weaverville.

In 2018 Caley was recognised with a Kiwibank New Zealander of the Year certificate for making a difference in the community through charity work 

In 2018 Hall won the trademark to Foveaux FM and launched a community station on 104.4FM in Invercargill based on the original adult contemporary radio station.

In 2019 Hall was again recognised with a Kiwibank New Zealander of the Year Certificate for making a difference in the community through charity work and a Kiwibank Community Hero of the Year New Zealand Medal 

The Fiordland Art Society present Caley Hall with an Honorary Life Membership in 2019 at the annual exhibition in Te Anau 

Caley Hall exhibited his largest 'work in progress' $120,0000 painting in 2019 which was reported on by the Ensign newspaper in Gore. He exhibited a collection of extremely large oil paintings which were mostly all still in the unfinished stage and the general public at the Mandeville Aviation Museum art exhibition were allowed to work on the huge master oils with him. His love of aviation and learning to fly combined with painting in front of large crowds was a huge success and he has been invited back to display and paint again at the Museum in 2020 and 2021. The exhibition was called 'Southern Scenes'.

References

External links
 

People from Invercargill
New Zealand painters
Landscape painters
Modern painters
1975 births
Living people